Charles Lawrence Davis (born September 7, 1949) is best known for being an outstanding college basketball player for Wake Forest University (WFU).  From New York City, he was the second African American player in Wake Forest's history.  Davis was the 1971 Atlantic Coast Conference (ACC) Men's Basketball Player of the Year, and the first black player to win the award.

Davis garnered first-team All-ACC honors for three years in a row, and was an eighth-round NBA draft pick (120th overall) by the Cleveland Cavaliers in 1971.

External links
NBA statistics

Sources
Charlie Davis

1949 births
Living people
American men's basketball players
Cleveland Cavaliers draft picks
Cleveland Cavaliers players
Point guards
Portland Trail Blazers players
Basketball players from New York City
Wake Forest Demon Deacons men's basketball players